Laguna de los Cristales (lit. Lagoon of the Crystals) is a small lake located in the Andes of O'Higgins Region in Central Chile. The lake is natural in origin, but its water level was raised by a dam inaugurated in 1976 aimed to provide water for irrigation in Rengo. Local folklore tells of a treasure, an entierro, that is hidden in the bottom of the lake.

References 

Lakes of O'Higgins Region